Venecia, Puente de Rialto is an oil painting by Giorgio of Chirico from 1950. The style of this work moves away from his metaphysical landscapes, characterized by the inclusion of architecture, sculptures and big empty spaces.

Description of the work
The strong impression that the Italian squares and sights caused on Greek artists is evident in this painting.
The main motif in this work is the Grand Canal. It widens towards the front and some of the sumptuous Venetian edifications line its banks.
The Puente de Rialto is the centre of the composition. It stands out by its white colour, imitated only by one of the lateral constructions.

References

Paintings by Giorgio de Chirico
Paintings in Mexico
Cityscape paintings of Venice
Neoclassicism
1950 paintings